The 1953 Campeonato Profesional was the sixth season of Colombia's top-flight football league. Twelve teams compete against one another and played each weekend. The tournament was notable for being the fifth and last year of El Dorado. Millonarios won the league for the fourth time in its history and for the third time in a row after getting 35 points.

Background
The tournament was the fifth year of El Dorado, after the DIMAYOR agreed the Pacto de Lima with the FIFA, with the requirement that the foreign players would return to their countries the next year.

Twelve teams competed in the tournament, three fewer than the previous year: Deportivo Manizales and Universidad were dissolved, while América de Cali and Independiente Medellín were bankrupt and did not join. Deportivo Samarios was refounded as Unión Magdalena. Millonarios won the championship for the third consecutive time, getting their fourth league title.

League system
Every team played two games against each other team, one at home and one away. Teams received two points for a win and one point for a draw. If two or more teams were tied on points, places were determined by goal difference. The team with the most points is the champion of the league.

Teams

Final standings

Results

Top goalscorers

Source: RSSSF.com Colombia 1953

References

External links
Dimayor Official Page

Prim
Colombia
Categoría Primera A seasons